Alexandre Dupontreue (20 April 1892 – 13 December 1951) was a French racing cyclist. He rode in the 1922 Tour de France.

References

1892 births
1951 deaths
French male cyclists
Place of birth missing